The Oklahoma City Oil Field is one of the world's giant petroleum fields and is located in Oklahoma City, Oklahoma in the United States of America. The field was opened just south of the city limits on December 4, 1928, and first entered Oklahoma City limits on May 27, 1930.

The field includes drill sites around the Oklahoma State Capitol and other nearby state government buildings.

History
The field was the first within an urban area in Oklahoma and caused immediate friction. The Oklahoma Corporation Commission passed an order stopping all drilling for 30 days on September 11, 1929. The Oklahoma City Council passed an ordinance in 1930 to limit drilling to one well per city block. Subsequent legal challenges and flagrant violations of the law led to Governor William H. Murray's declarations of martial law around the wells on May 5 and June 6 of 1932 and March 4, 1933. It also led to House Bill 481, passed April 10, 1933.

Subsequent development drilling opened up numerous other reservoirs including the Ordovician Basal Oil Creek Sand and the prolific Simpson "Wilcox" Sand.

Stratigraphically, the Oklahoma City anticline is a "bald-headed structure" with a major unconformity at the base of the Pennsylvanian sediments. Because of this, the most prolific reservoir of the field, the "Wilcox Sand", was found at the structurally lowest producing position within the field and was the last of the major Ordovician reservoirs to be developed. 

The high gas pressure wells suffered blowouts in the 1930s, the most prominent being the Wild Mary Sudik well.

Cumulative production from the field is in excess of 1 billion barrels of oil equivalent

Geology

The Oklahoma City Oil Field is in a faulted anticlinal structure located on the southern end of the Nemaha Ridge and the northeast rim of the Anadarko Basin.  The vertical normal fault bounds the anticline on the east side and the displacement of about  occurred simultaneously with the folding, forming a structural trap.  The top of the structural trap is marked by a pre-Pennsylvanian unconformity with sediments subcropping against the Oswego Lime.  The sedimentary section starts with the Arbuckle Dolomite overlain by Simpson strata, which includes the Oil Creek, McLish, Tulip Creek, and Wilcox sandstones, of Ordovician age, with the Wilcox being the most productive zone.  The Oswego limestone of Pennsylvanian age is a noted producer of gas.

References

Geography of Oklahoma City
Oil fields in Oklahoma
1928 establishments in Oklahoma
Urban oil fields